The 2023 Western Kentucky Hilltoppers football team will represent Western Kentucky University in the 2023 NCAA Division I FBS football season. The Hilltoppers will play their home games at Houchens Industries–L. T. Smith Stadium in Bowling Green, Kentucky, and will compete members of Conference USA. They will be led by fifth-year head coach Tyson Helton.

Schedule
Western Kentucky and Conference USA announced the 2023 football schedule on January 10, 2023.

References

Western Kentucky
Western Kentucky Hilltoppers football seasons
Western Kentucky Hilltoppers football